PressPlay (stylised pressplay) was the name of an online music store that operated from December 2001 until March 2003. It was created as a joint venture between Universal Music Group and Sony Music Entertainment in response to the popularity of Napster.

Universal and Sony created PressPlay rather than joining RealNetworks' online service MusicNet, which had signed BMG, EMI and AOL Time Warner. It was originally announced under the name Duet in May 2001 and launched as PressPlay in December 2001.

Apart from Universal and Sony, the service carried some music from BMG, EMI and Warner, as well as various independent labels. It was branded for multiple services, most notably Yahoo.com.

The service allowed users 500 low-quality audio streams in DRMed Windows Media Audio, 50 song downloads and 10 songs burnt to CD, for $15 a month. It could also build and store users' playlists. Not every song could be downloaded, and users could not burn more than two tracks from the same artist to CD. Downloads expired after 30 days. Songs could not be transferred to a portable player.

Artists were paid around $0.0023 (0.23 of a cent) per song. Many artists, outraged at this rate and stating their songs were being used without proper permission, sought to have their music removed from the service unless they were paid a licensing fee rather than a CD-style royalty.

Even before it was launched, the restrictions meant the service was not attractive to consumers. PressPlay and rival MusicNet were given the shared 9th place in PC World's 2006 list of the "25 Worst Tech Products of All Time", which stated that "the services' stunningly brain-dead features showed that the record companies still didn't get it".

Universal and Sony had also licensed at least a portion of their catalog to other, more successful online music stores such as
Streamwaves' Christian music service HigherWaves, FullAudio and Streamwaves' full product.

Roxio acquired the service on May 19, 2003, and used it as a base to launch their paid music service under the brand name Napster, and in 2004, Sony launched its Sony Connect service.

The disastrous history of Pressplay was later detailed in How Music Got Free by Stephen Witt, from the viewpoint of Universal Music CEO Doug Morris.

References

Defunct online music stores
Sony Music
Universal Music Group